William Bernard McGregor (born 1952) is an Australian linguist and professor in linguistics at Aarhus University. He specializes in the description of mainly non-Pama-Nyungan Australian languages and does descriptive linguistic work on Gooniyandi, Nyulnyul and Warrwa, but also studies the Shua language in Africa. He works on theoretical and typological issues from within a variation of systemic functional linguistics dubbed Semiotic Grammar developed by himself.

McGregor is a member of Academia Europaea and Fellow of the Australian Academy of the Humanities. He is also a Knight of Dannebrog since 2010. Editorial boards that McGregor serves on include the Australian Journal of Linguistics and Language and History.

Biography
McGregor received his PhD degree from the University of Sydney in 1984. In the following decade, he had a number of positions through different institutions in Australia, until he came to Europe. He was first a senior research fellow at KU Leuven in 1998 and then visiting research fellow at the Max Planck Institute for Psycholinguistics in Nijmegen for one and a half year. Since 2000, he has been full professor at Aarhus University.

Selected publications

Referencer

Living people
1952 births
Academic staff of Aarhus University
Members of Academia Europaea
Knights of the Order of the Dannebrog
Linguists of Australian Aboriginal languages
Linguists from Australia
University of Sydney alumni
Fellows of the Australian Academy of the Humanities